Magdalena Łuczak may refer to:
 Magdalena Łuczak (murderer)
 Magdalena Łuczak (alpine skier)